Pachymerinus is a genus of centipedes in the family Geophilidae. It was described by Italian entomologist Filippo Silvestri in 1905. Centipedes in this genus range from 3 cm to 8 cm in length, have 47 to 81 pairs of legs, and are found in Chile and southeast Australia.

Species
Valid species:
 Pachymerinus abbreviates Silvestri, 1905
 Pachymerinus australis Chamberlin, 1920
 Pachymerinus canaliculatus (Gervais, 1849)
 Pachymerinus froggatti Brolemann, 1912
 Pachymerinus millepunctatus (Gervais, 1847)
 Pachymerinus multiporus Demange, 1963
 Pachymerinus pluripes (Silvestri, 1899)
 Pachymerinus porter (Silvestri, 1899)

References

 

 
 
Centipede genera
Animals described in 1905
Taxa named by Filippo Silvestri